Alexej Pludek (29 January 1923, Prostějov – 7 September 2002, Prague) was a Czech writer. In 1950 his play "Případ Modrá Voda" (The Blue Water case) was shown on stage of "stage D50".

Bibliography
 Slunce v údolí (Sun in the Valley)-a "builder" novel,about the building of railway tracks in Slovakia.
 Dvě okna do dvora (Two windows into the courtyard) (1959)
 Ženy nemají pravdu (Women are not right (in sense of saying something that is false)) (1961)
 Ptačí pírko (A bird's feather) (1959) a book for children
 Tudy chodíval Ječmínek (Through here, Ječmínek walked) (1959)
 Horami jde březen (The March goes through the mountains) (1963)
 Pověsti dávných časů (The myths of old times) (1971)
 Český král Karel (Czech King Karel) (1978)
 Kralevic, král,císař (Prince,King,Emperor)
 Vabank (1974)
 Faraónův píšař (Pharao's amanuensis) (1966)
 Rádce velkých rádžů (The advisor of the Great Rajah's) (1975)
 Nepřítel z Atlantidy (Enemy from Atlantis) (1981)
 Hledání antipoda (In search of the antipode) (1986)
 Česká pře (Czech Litigation) (1989)

1923 births
2002 deaths
Writers from Prostějov
Czech male writers
Czechoslovak writers